South Harewood is a hamlet and civil parish in the Test Valley district of Hampshire, England. At the 2011 Census the population according to the Post Office was included in the civil parish of Wherwell.  Its nearest town is Andover, which lies approximately 2.5 miles (5.7 km) north-west from the hamlet.

Villages in Hampshire
Test Valley